MojisolaOluwa Kehinde Alli – Macaulay (née Alli) (born October 10, 1977) is a Nigerian politician, Lawmaker and a member of the All Progressive Congress APC. She is a Lagos State House of Assembly legislator, representing Amuwo Odofin Constituency I and the Chairperson of the Lagos State House of Assembly Committee on Women Affairs, Poverty Alleviation and Job Creation.

Early life 
Mojisolaoluwa was born in Surulere, Lagos State and she is from Lagos Island which is located in the southwestern part of Nigeria.

Education 
She had her primary education at Subola Nursery & Primary School 1982–1984 and concluded at Festac Primary School 1984–1990. Immediately after that she began her secondary school education at Festac Girls' Secondary School 1990–1993 and completed at Navy Town Secondary School 1993–1995 where she obtained the West African School Certificate.

She went on to obtain a Diploma at the Open University Milton Keynes, United Kingdom in Social science (2003). In 2015 she was awarded a Bachelor Of Arts degree in History & International Relations from Lagos State University. In 2021 she also obtained a degree in Law at the Lagos State University.

Personal life 
She is married to Honourable Jonathan Macaulay and they have two kids.

Professional career 
Mojisolaoluwa began her career in Journalism and Broadcast media in 1997 as a Duty Announcer For Radio Lagos/Eko FM (1997–1999), she worked immediately after that as a News Caster / Presenter at MITV/STAR FM for three years (1999–2001), then moved on to NTA 2 Channel 5 as a News Researcher, News presenter and Producer (2001–2002).

Political career 
She contested as a councillor in WARD B1, Amuwo Odofin under the Action Congress of Nigeria and won in (2010 -2013) . She was also the Former Deputy Leader, Amuwo Odofin Legislative Council, Amuwo Odofin Local Government Area.

In 2019 She Contested and Won in Amuwo Odofin Constituency 1 .She is currently a member on the 9th Legislative Assembly, Lagos State House Of Assembly.

References 

1977 births
Living people
Nigerian women in politics
All Progressives Congress politicians
People from Lagos State
Legislative speakers in Nigeria
Lagos State University alumni